Luoto is a Finnish surname. Notable people with the surname include:

 Olavi Luoto (born 1927), Finnish middle-distance runner
 Kati Luoto (born 1972), Finnish strength athlete
 Iiro Luoto (born 1984), American football tight end
 Joona Luoto (born 1997), Finnish professional hockey player

Finnish-language surnames